Tsuru (鶴) is a Japanese name. It means crane, and is used as a given name and a surname. Notable people with the name include:

Given name
Tsuru Aoki (1892–1961), Japanese stage and silent film actress
Tsuru Morimoto (born 1970), Japanese football player

Surname
Ayako Tsuru (born 1941), Mexican artist of Japanese descent
Hiromi Tsuru (1960–2017), Japanese voice actress
Kiso Tsuru (1894–1966), Japanese philanthropist 
Naoto Tsuru (born 1987), Japanese baseball player
Norihiro Tsuru, Japanese violinist and composer
Shigeto Tsuru (1912–2006), Japanese economist and politician
Toshiyuki Tsuru, anime director

Japanese feminine given names
Japanese-language surnames